"Come to Me"  is a song by American rapper and producer P. Diddy from his fourth studio album, Press Play (2006), featuring guest vocals from Pussycat Dolls lead singer Nicole Scherzinger. The song was written by Combs himself, Mike Winans, Scherzinger, Jacoby White, Shay Winans, Shannon "Slam" Lawrence, Roger Greene Jr., Richard Frierson and Yakubu Izuagbe with production held by Jai and Younglord.

History
"Come to Me" features an uncredited sample of Keak da Sneak's song "Super Hyphy." It also briefly interpolates the chorus of Warren G's "Relax Your Mind" in the beginning. The phone portrayed prominently at the beginning of the video is a Nokia 8800 (which was not readily available at the time of the video's shooting).

The reggae remix of "Come to Me" was leaked onto radio airwaves by a Syracuse, New York radio station in late September 2006. The remix features Elephant Man. Another remix of this song features Notorious B.I.G. An official remix has been released featuring Nicole Scherzinger, Yung Joc, T.I. & Young Dro.

Diddy performed "Come To Me" with Cassie on MTV Europe Music Awards 2006, as well as on the NBC pregame show for the opening game of the 2006 NFL season between the Miami Dolphins and the Pittsburgh Steelers at Heinz Field in Pittsburgh, Pennsylvania. He has also performed the song several times with Danity Kane. Plus, he performed it three times with Scherzinger.

Critical reception
The song received mixed reviews from critics. Kate Maidens of Gigwise wasn't impressed of the song calling it a "mediocre, second hand track." Although she did compliment Scherzinger for adding "some cutting edge vocals." Miriam Zendle of Digital Spy awarded the song 3 out 5 stars noted that "although this track is not one of the best we've heard from him, it's still clear that [Diddy has] put effort in with production."

Chart performance
"Come to Me" debuted on the U.S. Billboard Hot 100 at number ninety-three and peaked at number nine on its eighth week on the chart. It debuted on the U.S. Billboard Hot 100 at number ninety-three at its moderate digital downloads from its release. In its second week, "Come to Me" gained high single sales and digital downloads but moderate airplay pushing its position at number twenty-five, with one of the highest jumps in the Hot 100. Having high single sales across the U.S, "Come to Me"  peaked at number nine on the U.S. Billboard Hot 100 Singles Sales. "Come to Me" has also gained high digital downloads, making it a peak at number fifteen on the U.S. Billboard Hot Digital Songs.

Music video
The video for the song premiered on BET's Access Granted on August 8, 2006. It has also peaked at number thirteen on the Hot R&B/Hip-Hop Songs chart. The song did chart on BET's 106 & Park, where it reached number four, and reached number one on MTV's Sucker Free. By September 7, 2006, "Come to Me" was within the top 10 of the United States iTunes Music Store. In an interview with MTV News, Diddy elaborated that him and Scherzinger try to seduce each other. "She's definitely, to me, one of the next female superstars. I thought that she would play a great seductress and somebody that I could chase, too — the cat-and-mouse thing. And [I also thought] that we could dance and have some fun." Diddy also was inspired by British artists such as Mick Jagger as he wanted to emulate that rock-star attitude. "It definitely has a hip-hop, rock-star appeal. I admire all of the rock stars — especially a lot of the British rock stars — for their attitude. Looking at [Jagger] back in the day, and just how the clothes and the attitude were a part of it."

The video begins in a city where a black van pulls up in an unknown alley. Then, the clock shows the time of 4:30 and Diddy is seen with his girlfriend in bed and it turns to face the woman staring at the bed. Then, she heard her cellphone ring and an unknown figure (revealed to be Scherzinger) starts telling her about Diddy showing up. As the music begins, Diddy wakes up and a woman passes the phone to him. Meanwhile, Scherzinger is waiting inside a club where Diddy shows up and does the choreography while making eye contact with her. During the bridge, Diddy and Scherzinger both went upstairs to a dance on battle. After following Diddy in the flash of light, Scherzinger ends up in a maze with Diddy. Then, they see each other and the maze falls apart and the breakdown starts as Diddy and Scherzinger dance in a lighted room. At the end of the video, Scherzinger walks away and also Diddy stops her and both of them stare at each other with Diddy saying, "press play." The video ends with Diddy and Scherzinger staring at each other when a symbol of the press play shows in the middle.

Track listing
CD single
 "Come to Me" (radio version) (featuring Nicole Scherzinger) - 4:01
 "Come to Me" (clean) (featuring Nicole Scherzinger) - 4:34
 "Come to Me" (dirty) (featuring Nicole Scherzinger) - 4:34
 "Come to Me" (instrumental version) - 4:33
 "Come to Me" (call out hook) - 0:14

Credits and personnel
Credits are adapted from the liner notes of Press Play.

Recording
 Recorded at Compound Studio (Signal Hill, California); Daddys House Recording Studios, (New York City); Chalice Studio B, (Los Angeles, California)
 Mixed at Sony Studios (New York City)

Personnel

 Victor Abijaoudi – recording
 JD Andrew – recording
 Devon "Play" Barber – recording
 Cornell "Nell" Brown – assistant recording
 Sean "Diddy" Combs – songwriter, producer, lead vocals
 Iyanna Dean – background vocals
 Richard "Younglord" Frierson – songwriter, producer
 Roger Greene Jr. – songwriter
 Yakubu Izuagbe – songwriter
 Shannon "Slam" Lawrence – songwriter
 Rob Lewis – vocal producer
 Nicole Scherzinger – songwriter, lead vocals
 Pat Viala – mixer
 Jacoby White – songwriter
 Mario Winans – additional music
 Mike Winans – songwriter, vocal producer
 Shay Winans – songwriter, background vocals
 D. Woods – intro vocals

Charts

Weekly charts

Year-end charts

Certifications

Release history

References

2006 singles
2006 songs
Sean Combs songs
Nicole Scherzinger songs
Bad Boy Records singles
Atlantic Records singles
Music videos directed by Chris Robinson (director)
Songs written by Nicole Scherzinger
Songs written by Sean Combs